The Utah Law Enforcement Memorial by Lena Toritch is installed outside the Utah State Capitol in Salt Lake City, in the U.S. state of Utah.

Description and history
Dedicated on September 6, 2008, the memorial features three bronze statues and a stone wall.

References

External links

 

2008 establishments in Utah
2008 sculptures
Monuments and memorials in Utah
Outdoor sculptures in Salt Lake City
Sculptures of men in the United States
Statues in Utah